Exomilus is a genus of sea snails, marine gastropod mollusks in the family Raphitomidae.

Description
The small shell is, subcylindrical. It contains few whorls. The base is concave. The sculpture consists of radial ribs latticed by spiral cords. The outer lip is slightly thickened and denticulate within. The sinus is shallow and subsutural.

Distribution
The species in this marine genus are endemic to Australia.

Species
Species within the genus Exomilus include:
 Exomilus cancellatus (Beddome, 1883)
 Exomilus compressus Fedosov & Puillandre, 2012
 Exomilus cylindricus Laseron, 1954
 Exomilus dyscritos (Verco, 1906)
 Exomilus edychrous (Hervier, 1897)
 Exomilus lutarius (Hedley, 1907)
 Exomilus pentagonalis (Verco, 1896)
 Exomilus telescopialis (Verco, 1896)
Species brought into synonymy
 Exomilus anxius (Hedley, 1909): synonym of Exomilus edychrous (Hervier, 1897)
 Exomilus compressa Fedosov & Puillandre, 2012: synonym of Exomilus compressus Fedosov & Puillandre, 2012
 Exomilus fenestratus (Tate & May, 1900): synonym of Gatliffena fenestrata (Tate & May, 1900)
 Exomilus perangulata Hervier, 1897 : synonym of Mangelia orophoma Melvill & Standen, 1896
 Exomilus spica (Hedley, 1907):  synonym of Exomilopsis spica (Hedley, 1907)

References

 Hedley, 1919 [Journal of the Royal Society of New South Wales, supplement to vol. 51: 79, 81]
 Powell, A.W.B. 1966. The molluscan families Speightiidae and Turridae, an evaluation of the valid taxa, both Recent and fossil, with list of characteristic species. Bulletin of the Auckland Institute and Museum. Auckland, New Zealand 5: 1–184, pls 1–23

External links
 Worldwide Mollusc Species Data Base: Raphitomidae
  Bouchet, P.; Kantor, Y. I.; Sysoev, A.; Puillandre, N. (2011). A new operational classification of the Conoidea (Gastropoda). Journal of Molluscan Studies. 77(3): 273-308
 Fedosov, Alexander E., and Nicolas Puillandre. "Phylogeny and taxonomy of the Kermia–Pseudodaphnella (Mollusca: Gastropoda: Raphitomidae) genus complex: a remarkable radiation via diversification of larval development." Systematics and Biodiversity 10.4 (2012): 447-477 

 
Raphitomidae
Gastropods of Australia
Gastropod genera